Meridian Hall is an historic house in the Columbia Heights neighborhood of Washington, D.C.  It has been listed on the District of Columbia Inventory of Historic Sites since 1990 and it was listed on the National Register of Historic Places in 1991 as the Mansion at 2401 15th Street, NW.

History
The house was commissioned by Mary Foote Henderson who led the movement to make Sixteenth Street NW and the Meridian Hill area of Washington and enclave of mansions and embassies.     This structure did serve as an embassy,  as it was intended, for a brief period of time.

Architecture
George Oakley Totten, Jr., who was known as Washington's leading Beaux-Arts architect, designed this house in the Tudor Revival style.  It was completed in 1923. The exterior features a scored stucco façade which is reminiscent of an English manor house.  The front sports a large arched entrance portal and the building has panels of casement windows and cast stone quatrefoil ornamentation.  The interior features a large central staircase, salons, ballroom, and a dining hall that is ornamented in the Tudor classical style.

References

Columbia Heights, Washington, D.C.
Houses completed in 1923
Tudor Revival architecture in Washington, D.C.
Houses on the National Register of Historic Places in Washington, D.C.